Dalla thalia is a species of butterfly in the family Hesperiidae. It is found in Ecuador.

References

External links
Image - Butterflies of America Foundation

Butterflies described in 1955
thalia